Jamal Taslaq (born 1970) is a Palestinian high fashion designer living and working in Italy. His style blends Eastern and Western clothing codes.

Biography

Taslaq was born in Nablus in 1970. After high school, he studied design in Jordan. He left for Italy in 1990 where he studied fashion. He founded his eponymous atelier in Rome in 1999.

His work has been displayed at Fashion for Peace, Fashion in the Mediterranean, Fundraising for the needy, UNICEF fashion show for the children.

Exhibitions
Selected exhibitions where his work has been presented

 Apr. 2011 – Ramallah, Palestine
 Dec. 2010 – Marrakech, Morocco - fashion Day Morocco during Festival International du Film de Marrakech
 Apr. 2010 - Amman, Jordan - High Fashion Show at Four Seasons Hotel
 Feb. 2009 – Rome, Italy - High Fashion Show
 Dec. 2009 - Sorrento, Italy – In the setting of the High life of Italy
 Nov. 2009 – Kuala Lumpur, Malaysia - in the presence of the King and Queen
 Jun. 2009 – Florence, Italy - Fashion Show
 Feb. 2008 – Rome, Italy, AltaRoma AltaModa High Fashion Show

He has dressed famous Italian singers on television and prime concerts and festivals.

References

External links 
 

1970 births
Living people
Italian fashion designers
Luxury brands
Palestinian emigrants to Italy